Western Islands is the publishing arm of the John Birch Society (JBS). Originally in Belmont, Massachusetts, Western Islands is now located in Appleton, Wisconsin, where the JBS has its current headquarters. Alongside the American Opinion Bookstores and Speakers' Bureau, Western Islands was one of the primary organs by which the John Birch Society distributed its published materials across the continent.

Selected publications

 Allen, Gary (1971). Nixon: The Man Behind the Mask.
 Allen, Gary (1971). Nixon’s Palace Guard. .
 Burnham, James (1965). The Web of Subversion: Underground Networks in the U.S. Government. .
 du Berrier, Hilaire (1965). Background to Betrayal: The Tragedy of Vietnam. .
 Evans, M. Stanton (1970). The Assassination of Joe McCarthy. 
 Granovsky, Anatoli (1962). I Was An NKVD Agent: A Top Soviet Spy Tells His Story. .
 Greaves, Percy L., Jr. (1973). Understanding the Dollar Crisis. Foreword by Ludwig von Mises.
 Griffin, G. Edward (1964). The Fearful Master: A Second Look at the United Nations. .
 Griffin, G. Edward (1968). The Great Prison Break: The Supreme Court Leads the Way. .
 Griffin, G. Edward (1981). This is the John Birch Society: An Invitation to Membership [3rd ed.] . . Recorded Dec. 17, 1969.
 Huddleston, Sisley (1965). France: The Tragic Years, 1939-1947.
 Jasper, William F. (1992). Global Tyranny... Step by Step: The United Nations and the Emerging New World Order. .
 Kelly, Clarence (1974). Conspiracy Against God and Man. .
 Lane, Arthur Bliss (1965). I Saw Poland Betrayed: An American Ambassador Reports to the American People. The Americanist Library, One Dozen Candles, Vol. 2. Full text.
 Linington, Elizabeth (1965). Come to Think of It.
 Lumpkin, Grace (1962). Full Circle. .
 Robison, John (1976). Proofs of a Conspiracy. Originally published in 1797.
 Sennholz, Hans F. (1979). The Age of Inflation. .
 Smoot, Dan (1965). The Invisible Government. .
 Smoot, Dan (1973). The Business End of Government.
 Somoza, Anastasio and Jack Cox (1980). Nicaragua Betrayed. . . . Full text.
 Sturdza, Michel (1968). The Suicide of Europe: Memoirs by Prince Michel Sturdza, Former Foreign Minister of Rumania.
 Welch, Robert (1959). The Blue Book of The John Birch Society. . Full text at HathiTrust.
 Welch, Robert (1960). The Life of John Birch: In the Story of One American Boy, the Ordeal of his Age. .
 Welch, Robert (1963). The Politician.
 Welch, Robert (1966). The New Americanism: And Other Speeches. . .
 Willoughby, Charles A. (1965). Shanghai Conspiracy: The Sorge Spy Ring, Moscow, Shanghai, Tokyo, San Francisco, New York. Preface by General Douglas MacArthur. The Americanist Library, One Dozen Candles. .

See also
 John Birch Society
 John H. Rees
 The New American
 One Dozen Candles
 Western Goals Foundation

External links
 John Birch Society website
 Western Islands at HathiTrust
 Western Islands at Internet Archive
 Western Islands at Open Library

References

Bibliography
 American Opinion book list (1968)

Anti-communism
Appleton, Wisconsin
Book publishing companies of the United States
Political organizations based in the United States
Anti-communism in the United States
John Birch Society
Publishing companies established in the 20th century
Political book publishing companies